The Miscast Barbarian: a Biography of Robert E. Howard is a biography by science-fiction writer L. Sprague de Camp, first published in hardcover and trade paperback in 1975 by Gerry de la Ree.

Summary
The work is an examination of Robert E. Howard, the famous fantasy writer and creator of Conan the Barbarian.

Relation to other works
The book is an expansion of de Camp's article "The Miscast Barbarian", which appeared in the magazine Fantastic in June, 1971. Later, in collaboration with Catherine Crook de Camp and Jane Whittington Griffin, he expanded the text again, into Dark Valley Destiny: the Life of Robert E. Howard (1983), the first major independent biography of Howard.

Notes

1975 non-fiction books
American biographies
Books by L. Sprague de Camp
Books about Robert E. Howard